The name Andres has been used for eight tropical cyclones in the Eastern Pacific Ocean:
 Hurricane Andres (1979), made landfall in Mexico as a tropical depression.
 Tropical Storm Andres (1985), formed near the Mexican coast but moved out to sea.
 Tropical Storm Andres (1991), stayed well clear of land.
 Tropical Storm Andres (1997), formed near Central America and made landfall in San Salvador.
 Tropical Storm Andres (2003), remained in mid-ocean.
 Hurricane Andres (2009), tracked parallel to the southwestern coast of Mexico.
 Hurricane Andres (2015), remained in the open ocean and never affected land.
 Tropical Storm Andres (2021), remained over the open ocean.

Pacific hurricane set index articles